Engelbrecht (or Englebrecht, Engelbrekt) is a common family name (surname) of Germanic origin. The name Engelbrecht has multiple translations, including "Angel Glorious" and "Bright Angel". The Surname Database says the name is a Dutch variant of an Old High German given name sometimes spelled Ingelbert or Engelbert. Engel can translate as "Angle" (the name of a German folk hero), a person from Angeln, or "angel". Brecht can translate as "bright" or "famous". The name was popular in Middle Age France because it was the name of a son-in-law of Charlemagne.

The first spelling variant of this name recorded in a survey was the Latinized given name Engelbricus in the Domesday Book of 1089. Engelbricht de Stanlega was recorded in the Pipe rolls of Somerset of 1176. Robert Ingleberd was the first record of a variant of "Engelbrecht" used as a family name, dated 1230 in the Pipe rolls of Yorkshire.

Some variations of the surname Engelbrecht such as Engelbert and Engelberdt are common. There was in the county of Flanders a family of Inghelbrechts whose name is recorded since the 13th century. Their offspring live mainly in actual Belgium, France, United Kingdom, Canada, United States and Australia.

Given name
Roald Engelbrecht Gravning Amundsen (1872-1928), Norwegian explorer of polar regions
Engelbrekt Engelbrektsson or Engelbrecht Engelbrechtsson (1390s-1436), Swedish statesman and rebel
Engelbert Kaempfer or Engelbrecht (1651-1716), German traveler and physician
Engelbrecht Rodenburg, Dutch volleyball player

Surname
Adriaan Engelbrecht, South African rugby player
Daniel Engelbrecht, German football player
Erwin Engelbrecht (1891-1964), German military officer, commander of Engelbrecht Division
Grazjyna Engelbrecht, South African field hockey player
H. C. Engelbrecht (1895-1939), American author
Ian Engelbrecht, Zimbabwean cricketer
Jacques Engelbrecht, South African rugby player
JJ Engelbrecht, South African rugby player
Joubert Engelbrecht, South African rugby player
Julie Engelbrecht, French-born German actress
Kim Engelbrecht, South African actress
Kepler Engelbrecht, German programmer
Morné Engelbrecht, Namibian cricketer
Rabian Engelbrecht, South African cricketer
Richard Engelbrecht-Wiggans, American economist
Sybrand Engelbrecht (soldier) (born 1913), South African Defence Force Chief
Sybrand Engelbrecht (cricketer) (born 1988), South African cricketer
Willem Anthony Engelbrecht (1839-1921), Dutch jurist

Fictional characters
Engelbrecht, a "dwarf surrealist boxer" in short stories by Maurice Richardson

See also
Engelbrekt Rebellion

Sources 

Surnames of German origin
Afrikaans-language surnames
Dutch-language surnames